Oskar Vind Rasmussen (born 8 August 2000) is a Danish handballplayer for GOG Håndbold and the Danish national team.

Career
Vind Rasmussen played as a junior for Roskilde Håndbold. His last years in Roskilde he played for both their junior and senior team. In 2019 he shifted to TMS Ringsted. Since 2022 he's playing for GOG Håndbold.

He made his debut for the Danish national team on 9 March 2023, scoring one goal.

Achievements
Individual awards
 All-Star Team as Best Right wing Danish League 2021–22

References

2000 births
Living people
Danish male handball players
People from Roskilde